The Tennis Federation of Serbia ( / Teniski savez Srbije) is the organizing body of tennis in Serbia. 

The Federation's current president is Mirko Petrović, who awarded the "Ponos nacije" (Pride of the Nation) Award to Ana Ivanovic in 2012.

List of presidents
 Hinko Würth (1922–1934)
 Stefan Hadži (1934–1937)
 Drago Čop (1937–1941)
 Mišo Pavićević (1948–1953)
 Dušan Korać (1954–1958)
 Mirko Mastilović (1959–1963)
 Miladin Šakić (1964–1966)
 Dušan Korać (1967–1977)
 Stjepan Tončić (1978–1982)
 Radmilo Nikolić (1982)
 Ernest Nađ (1983)
 Blagoje Andrejevski (1984)
 Tomislav Poljak (1985)
 Anton Tonejc (1986)
 Božidar Martinović (1987)
 Ferdinand Trupej (1988)
 Petar Marinković (1989–1991)
 Radmilo Nikolić (1992–1993)
 Rodoljub Radulović (1994–1996)
 Radoman Božović (1996–2000)
 Predrag Mitrović (2000–2004)
 Boško Ivanović (2004–2006)
 Slobodan Živojinović (2006–2011)
 Vuk Jeremić (2011–2015)
 Mirko Petrović (2015–present)

See also 
 Serbia Davis Cup team
 Serbia Billie Jean King Cup team
 Serbia at the Hopman Cup

References

External links
TeniskiSavez.com - Official website

Serbia
Tennis in Serbia
Tennis
1922 establishments in Serbia